This is a list of all seasons played by NK Osijek in national and European football, from 1947 to the most recent completed season.

This list details the club's achievements in all major competitions, and the top scorers for each season (note that only goals scored in league matches are taken into account).

SFR Yugoslavia (1947–1991)

Croatia (1992–present)

Seasons
 
Osijek
Osijek Seasons